Lidia Ávila (born Lidia Erika Ávila Beltrán on September 13, 1979, in Puebla, Puebla, Mexico) is a Mexican singer and actress.

Filmography

References

External links

1979 births
Living people
Mexican child actresses
Mexican telenovela actresses
Mexican television actresses
Mexican film actresses
Mexican stage actresses
Actresses from Puebla
Singers from Puebla
20th-century Mexican actresses
21st-century Mexican actresses
People from Puebla
21st-century Mexican singers
21st-century Mexican women singers